The discography of DJ Symphony, an American hip hop disc jockey, consist of sixteen mixtapes.

Discography

Singles
2019: Anti Mumble Rap (featuring Sadat X & Ceazar)
2020: Real Hip-Hop (featuring Jeru the Damaja, Pyscho Les & Sadat X)

Albums
TBA: It's Bigger Than Music

Mixtapes
2010: Certified Crack: Vial 1 (hosted by Raekwon)
2011: Certified Crack: Vial 2 (hosted by Raekwon)
2011: Certified Crack: Memorial Weekend (hosted by Raekwon)
2011: Messy Sheets
2011: Fight For The Carter: Wayne Vs Shawn
2012: 365 Takeova Series: 2-10-12 (hosted by DJ Symphony & DJ Dames Nellas) 
2012: 365 Takeova Series: 3-16-12 (hosted by DJ Symphony & DJ Dames Nellas)
2012: I Love Canada
2012: Dipset Vs Wu-Tang
2012: I Love America
2012: Certified Crack: Common Vs Drake
2012: I Am Trayvon Martin
2012: Certified Crack: Waka Flocka Vs Wiz Khalifa
2012: Certified Crack: MMG Vs YMCMB
2014: Certified Crack: The Best Of Superwoman (hosted by Lil' Mo)
2018: Wu-Invasion Mixtape Series: Australian Edition Volume 1 (hosted by GZA)
2018: Wu-Invasion Mixtape Series: World Edition Volume 1 (hosted by Ghostface Killah)
2018: Wu-Invasion Mixtape Series: World Edition Volume 2 (hosted by Ghostface Killah)
2019: Wu-Invasion Mixtape Series: Valentines Day Massacre (hosted by Ghostface Killah)
2020: Classic Throwback Mixtape Series: Volume 1 (hosted by Faizon Love)

Guest appearances
2010: "The Columbian Necktie" Raekwon (hosted by DJ Symphony)
2010: "Dead or Alive" The Cartel (hosted by DJ Symphony)
2011: "Digital Money" Da Tykoon (hosted by DJ Symphony)
2011: "The Vault" Nino Graye (hosted by DJ Symphony)

References

External links
 Official website
 
 

Hip hop discographies
Discographies of American artists